This page lists board and card games, wargames, miniatures games, and tabletop role-playing games published in 2009.  For video games, see 2009 in video gaming.

Games released or invented in 2009

Game awards given in 2009
Mensa Select: Cornerstone, Dominion, Marrekech, Stratum, Tic-Tac-Ku
Spiel des Jahres: Dominion
 Games: Small World
 Maria won the Spiel Portugal Jogo do Ano.

Significant games-related events in 2009
Mattel, Inc. purchases Sekkoia SAS, makers of Blokus, Blokus Trigon, Blokus 3D, Blokus Duo, and Blokus Giant for an undisclosed sum.

Deaths

See also
List of game manufacturers
2009 in video gaming

References

Games
Games by year